Movie Ending Romance is the second EP from Seattle, Washington indie pop band Math and Physics Club. Released in July 2005, it followed their debut EP Weekends Away by just five months.

Track listing
"Movie Ending Romance"  
"White and Grey"  
"Graduation Day"  
"You're So Good to Me" (Wilson/Love)

External links
Official Math and Physics Club website
Math and Physics Club @ MySpace

2005 EPs
Math and Physics Club albums